Wayne Nathan Nance (October 18, 1955September 4, 1986), also known as The Missoula Mauler, was an American serial killer in the state of Montana. Nance was shot and killed while committing a home invasion of a co-worker's residence; thus, Nance was never formally charged, tried, or convicted of any murder. Authorities reported that physical evidence linked Nance to several unsolved murders and crimes.

Murders

1970s
Nance is believed to have raped and murdered a middle-aged woman named Donna Pounds in 1974. Pounds had been held captive in her basement, tied to a chair, and shot. Nance, an acquaintance of the victim's teenage son, was seen in the victim's back yard about the time of Pounds' death and was questioned by police who could not find firm evidence linking him to the crime. Years later, police searched Nance's home and discovered evidence linking him to the Pounds murder.

Nance served in the United States Navy from 1974 to 1977, and investigators later suspected he might have committed more crimes while traveling for his military service.

1980s
On February 27, 1980, the badly decomposed body of 15-year-old Devonna Nelson, a Seattle runaway, was discovered on a roadbank close to the city of Missoula. Because of the condition of the body, her remains were not identified until February 1985. Prior to her identity being confirmed, she was dubbed "Betty Beavertail" after the nearby Beavertail Hill State Park. Nance is suspected of killing Nelson, but has not been definitively linked to the crime.

The body of Marcella Cheri "Marci" Bachmann, 16, was found in an advanced state of decomposition on December 24, 1984, by a hiker. The body had been buried in a shallow grave. Strong evidence indicates that Nance murdered Bachmann. Investigators found hair similar to Bachmann's in Nance's home. She had run away from Vancouver, Washington, due to conflict with her family members. She was killed by three gun shots to the head. Like Devonna Nelson, Bachmann was given a nickname before she was identified: "Debbie Deer Creek," after a nearby drainage basin. Bachmann was identified in 2006 through DNA profiling. Her cremated remains were subsequently interred.

Bachmann had been seen alive with Nance, who had "taken her in" after she was left by a trucker in the area. She may have used the alias name "Robin" and claimed to have been either native to Texas or had passed through the state. Nance claimed she had left the area in September 1984, which was about the time she was killed. Her brother Derek Bachmann had been searching for Marcella since he was 21 years old, along with a private investigator. He originally believed that she may have supported herself as a prostitute while away from home and may have become a victim of Gary Ridgway. Ridgway murdered at least 49 runaway children and prostitutes during the 1980s and 1990s. However, Marcella was never identified as one of his victims.

On September 11, 1985, the skeleton of Janet L. Lucas, 23, was found in Missoula, Montana, with two .32 caliber bullets in her skull. Investigators believe she died between 1983 and 1985. Lucas' remains went unidentified until May 2021, and she was initially believed to be of Asian descent. Like the other Jane Does found near East Missoula, Lucas was given a name before she was identified, "Christy Crystal Creek". Based on examination, her age range was between 18 and 35 years old. She was between 4 feet 10 and 5 feet 2 inches tall and weighed between 90 and 110 pounds. Examination indicated that she most likely had a history of smoking and had many fillings in her teeth, as well as two root canals. She also had had oral surgery that used characteristically Asian dental techniques, involving the screwing of a dental post into the tooth. After genetic genealogy research was conducted after a successful DNA extraction, it was learned that Lucas originated from Spokane, Washington, having disappeared from Sandpoint, Idaho during the summer of 1983. It is unknown when or why she came to Montana. Nance has not been definitively linked to this murder, but he is the only suspect.

Nance is also responsible for the December 12, 1985, murders of Michael and Teresa Shook in Ravalli County, Montana, who were tied up inside their home and stabbed to death. The killer then attempted to destroy evidence by burning the house down. The couple's four children survived the crime. Items stolen from the Shook residence were later found in Nance's home.

Before Nance's death and the discovery of his crimes, some of the murders were tentatively ascribed to David Meirhofer (1949-1974). A native Montanan and military veteran, Meirhofer confessed to four murders and then killed himself in custody in 1974, but authorities believed he may have committed additional crimes.

Death
On September 3, 1986, Nance attempted to murder Doug and Kris Wells. Nance worked at the Wells' furniture moving company, and engaged Doug in friendly conversation while they were in the front yard of his home. Nance asked if he could borrow a flashlight, and after Doug invited him inside, Nance struck Doug in the head, before tying up both him and Kris. Nance then stabbed Doug in the chest and left him to die in the basement. Nance forced Kris into the bedroom on the second floor to rape her.

Although badly wounded, Doug managed to free himself and load one bullet in a rifle he had been repairing. Doug staggered up to the second floor where his wife was being assaulted in their bedroom. Nance and Doug engaged in further altercations, ending with Doug shooting and incapacitating Nance. Nance and the Wellses were rushed to a hospital, where Doug and Kris made full recoveries. Nance's injuries proved fatal, and he died the following day.

After the incident with the Wellses, authorities investigated Nance's background and other crimes, initially noting similarities between the Wells incident and the murders of Michael and Teresa Shook.

See also 
 List of serial killers in the United States

References

Cited works and further reading
 

1955 births
1986 deaths
20th-century American criminals
American male criminals
American murderers of children
American rapists
American serial killers
Crime in Montana
Criminals from Montana
Deaths by firearm in Montana
Male serial killers
People from Missoula, Montana
Violence against men in North America
Violence against women in the United States